Vacuolar protein sorting-associated protein 33B is a protein that in humans is encoded by the VPS33B gene.

Function 

Vesicle mediated protein sorting plays an important role in segregation of intracellular molecules into distinct organelles. Genetic studies in yeast have identified more than 40 vacuolar protein sorting (VPS) genes involved in vesicle transport to vacuoles. This gene is a member of the Sec-1 domain family, and encodes the human ortholog of rat Vps33b which is homologous to the yeast class C Vps33 protein. The mammalian class C Vps proteins are predominantly associated with late endosomes/lysosomes, and like their yeast counterparts, may mediate vesicle trafficking steps in the endosome/lysosome pathway.

Model organisms 

Model organisms have been used in the study of VPS33B function. A conditional knockout mouse line called Vps33btm1a(EUCOMM)Wtsi was generated at the Wellcome Trust Sanger Institute. Male and female animals underwent a standardized phenotypic screen to determine the effects of deletion. Additional screens performed: In-depth immunological phenotyping

References

Further reading